Conus nielsenae, common name Nielsen's cone, is a species of sea snail, a marine gastropod mollusk in the family Conidae, the cone snails and their allies.

Like all species within the genus Conus, these snails are predatory and venomous. They are capable of "stinging" humans, therefore live ones should be handled carefully or not at all.

Notes
Additional information regarding this species:
 Taxonomy: The status of Conus nielsenae, Conus reductaspiralis and Conus thevenardensis has been disputed by some authors, but Australian specialists generally regard them as distinct. For conservation evaluation, all three are here listed as distinct.

The subspecies Conus nielsenae reductaspiralis Walls, 1979 is a synonym of Conus reductaspiralis Walls, 1979

Description
The size of the shell varies between 28 mm and 55 mm.

Distribution
This marine species occurs off the Kermadec Islands and off Australia (New South Wales, Queensland).

References

 Marsh, J.A. 1962. Two new cone shells (Mollusca: Conidae) from Queensland. Journal of the Malacological Society of Australasia 6: 40–42 
 Röckel, D., Korn, W. & Kohn, A.J. 1995. Manual of the Living Conidae. Volume 1: Indo-Pacific Region. Wiesbaden : Hemmen 517 pp.
 Tucker J.K. & Tenorio M.J. (2009) Systematic classification of Recent and fossil conoidean gastropods. Hackenheim: Conchbooks. 296 pp
 Puillandre N., Duda T.F., Meyer C., Olivera B.M. & Bouchet P. (2015). One, four or 100 genera? A new classification of the cone snails. Journal of Molluscan Studies. 81: 1–23

External links
 The Conus Biodiversity website
 Cone Shells - Knights of the Sea
 

nielsenae
Gastropods described in 1962